Keane Neill Barry (born 25 June 2002) is an Irish professional darts player who plays in Professional Darts Corporation (PDC) and Youth Development Tour events. The highlight of his career was beating Conor Allen in a narrow 2-0 victory in a junior darts event in 2019. He was the World Masters Youth Champion and BDO World Youth Champion.

Career
Barry won the 2019 World Boys Masters, defeating Charlie Manby of England, having previously been runner-up in 2017 and 2018. He is the only player ever to qualify for 3 World Boys Masters finals. In 2019, Barry won the Junior Darts Corporation International Open, beating Nathan Girvan and won the final of the Tom Kirby Irish Matchplay, beating Liam Gallagher. He qualified for the 2020 PDC World Darts Championship. He defeated Adam Gawlas in the 2019 JDC World Championship final. He beat Leighton Bennett 3–0 in the 2020 BDO World Youth Championships final.

Barry made the semi-finals of the 2019 PDC World Youth Championship, where he lost 6–2 to Luke Humphries.

He beat Adam Gawlas to become the 2020 Junior Darts Corporation World Champions.

PDC
In January 2020, Barry went to PDC UK Q-School. On the fourth day, he reached the final where he played two-time BDO World Champion Scott Waites for a tour card, which Keane lost 0–5. He spent 2020 competing in Development Tour and Challenge Tour events with three victories in four finals across the 20 events. He finished second on the 2020 Development Tour Order of Merit to secure a two-year PDC tour card for 2021/2022.

In the 2022 UK Open Barry beat defending champion James Wade 10–4 in the quarter finals. Barry lost in the semi final 6–11 to Michael Smith.

World Championship results

PDC
 2020: First round (lost to Vincent van der Voort 0–3) 
 2021: First round (lost to Jeff Smith 1–3)
 2022: Second round (lost to Jonny Clayton 2–3)
 2023: First round (lost to Grant Sampson 1–3)

Performance timeline

PDC European Tour

External links

References

Living people
2002 births
Irish darts players
Sportspeople from County Meath
British Darts Organisation players
Professional Darts Corporation current tour card holders